Solomon Courthouse may refer to one of two United States federal court buildings:

 Joel W. Solomon Federal Building and United States Courthouse, Nashville, Tennessee 
 Gus J. Solomon United States Courthouse, Portland, Oregon